Tatyana Aleksandrovna Roshchina (born June 23, 1941 in Moscow) is a former Soviet competitive volleyball player and Olympic silver medalist.

References

Soviet women's volleyball players
Olympic volleyball players of the Soviet Union
Volleyball players at the 1964 Summer Olympics
Olympic silver medalists for the Soviet Union
1941 births
Living people
Russian women's volleyball players
Olympic medalists in volleyball
Medalists at the 1964 Summer Olympics